Richard Marin may refer to:
 Cheech Marin (born 1946), American comedian and actor
 Richard Marin (investment banker) (born 1953), American investment banker